Solarte Island (in Spanish: Isla Solarte), also known as Nancy's Cay, (in Spanish: Cayo Nancy) is an 8 km2 island located only 1 mile east of Bocas del Toro, in the  Bocas del Toro Province, Panama. The two hundred Ngöbe Buglé fishing community lives on the island without electricity or telephone system, capturing water from a well.

A medical facility, later known as Hospital Point (in Spanish: Punta Hospital), was built upon a hill on the western end of the island by the United Fruit Company for treatment of patients with yellow fever and malaria in 1899 but it was decommissioned and moved to Almirante in 1920.

See also
 List of islands of Panama

References

Caribbean islands of Panama